Sungai Puyu is a state constituency in Penang, Malaysia, that has been represented in the Penang State Legislative Assembly.

 The State Assemblyman for Sungai Puyu is Phee Boon Poh from the Democratic Action Party (DAP), which is part of the state's ruling coalition, Pakatan Harapan (PH).

Definition 
The Sungai Puyu constituency contains the polling districts of 8 polling districts.

Demographics

History 
The Sungai Puyu state constituency was created and first contested during the 1995 State Election.

Loo Ah Dee and Lee Ah Lee, politicians from Malaysian Chinese Association (MCA) first held the seat from 1995 to 2004. During the 2004 state elections, the constituency was wrested from the Barisan Nasional (BN) federal ruling coalition by Phee Boon Poh, a DAP politician. Phee has held Sungai Puyu since.

Election results

See also 
 Constituencies of Penang

References

Penang state constituencies